Bodung Station is a railway station located in Bodung in Nes, Norway on the Kongsvinger Line. The station was built in 1913 as part of the Kongsvinger Line. The station is served hourly, with extra rush hour departures, by the Oslo Commuter Rail line R14 operated by Vy.

External links
 Norwegian National Rail Administration's page on Bodung

Railway stations in Nes, Akershus
Railway stations on the Kongsvinger Line
Railway stations opened in 1913
1913 establishments in Norway